YALLFest is a public two-day annual young adult book festival in Charleston, South Carolina that is the largest of its kind in the South. The festival was founded in 2011 by Jonathan Sanchez of the Charleston bookstore Blue Bicycle Books along with authors Kami Garcia and Margaret Stohl. Author Melissa de la Cruz joined as Director of Development in 2012. Authors Veronica Roth and Brendan Reichs now co-chair the festival.

In 2015, Stohl and de la Cruz co-founded a sister festival, YALLWEST, that occurs every spring in Santa Monica, California.

Attending authors

2011

Festival Director: Jonathan Sanchez

Author Track Guests:

2012

Festival Director: Jonathan Sanchez

YALLFest 2012 Keynote Conversation: Cassandra Clare and Holly Black

Author Track Guests:

2013

YALLFest 2013 brought together forty-eight top young adult, middle grade and crossover writers (including 25 New York Times Bestsellers) from all over the country.

Festival Director: Jonathan Sanchez

Programming Directors: Margaret Stohl (YA), Melissa de la Cruz (Crossover), Pseudonymous Bosch (Middle Grade)

YALLFest 2013 Keynote Conversation: Veronica Roth and Rae Carson (Presented by Epic Reads & HarperTeen)

Author Track Guests:

2014

Author Track Guests:

See also

 Books in the United States

References

External links
 YALLFest Facebook Page
 YALLFest website

Book fairs in the United States
Festivals in South Carolina
Tourist attractions in Charleston, South Carolina
Young adult literature